The 2017 Atlanta United FC season was the first season of Atlanta United FC's existence, and the ninth year that a professional soccer club from Atlanta, Georgia competed in the top division of American soccer. Atlanta played at Bobby Dodd Stadium for the first half of the season, then finished the season at the team's new stadium, Mercedes-Benz Stadium, once it was completed in September. The team was coached by Gerardo "Tata" Martino. Outside of MLS, Atlanta United participated in the 2017 U.S. Open Cup and the 2017 MLS Cup Playoffs, as well as various preseason competitions.

Atlanta qualified for the MLS Cup Playoffs in their first season, becoming the third-ever MLS expansion club to qualify for the playoffs in their inaugural season, and the first since the Seattle Sounders FC did so in 2009. The team was eliminated from the playoffs in the opening round by the Columbus Crew, losing on penalty kicks.

2017 marked the first year since 1981 that a first division American soccer team played in Atlanta following the Atlanta Chiefs' dissolving. It was also the first time that soccer had been played at Bobby Dodd Stadium since 2001, when the Atlanta Beat called the stadium home during the 2001 WUSA season.

Club

Results

Non-competitive

Friendlies

Carolina Challenge Cup

Competitive

Major League Soccer

League tables

Eastern Conference

Overall

Results summary

Results by round

Matches

MLS Cup Playoffs

U.S. Open Cup

Statistics

Top scorers

Disciplinary record

Player movement

In 
Per Major League Soccer and club policies terms of the deals do not get disclosed.

Draft picks 

Draft picks are not automatically signed to the team roster. Only those who are signed to a contract will be listed as transfers in.

Loan in

Out 
Per Major League Soccer and club policies terms of the deals do not get disclosed.

Loan out

Non-player transfers

Honors

Weekly / Monthly

MLS player of the month

MLS team / player / coach of the week

MLS goal / save of the week

Annual

References

Atlanta United FC seasons
Atlanta United
Atlanta United
2017 in sports in Georgia (U.S. state)